The Supernatural Events on Campus is a 2013 Chinese thriller horror film directed by Guan Er and written by Liang Xiaoxiao and Zhu Bo, and stars Zhao Yihuan, Wang Yi, Li Manyi, Zhai Wenbin, and Kong Qianqian. It based on the novel of the same name by Lan Ze. The film was released in China on 12 July 2013.

Cast
 Zhao Yihuan as Su Su, the most beautiful school beauty of Huaxi College.
 Wang Yi as Lin Feng, Su Su's classmate and first lover.
 Li Manyi as Sister An.
 Zhai Wenbin as Yang Dong.
 Kong Qianqian as Lu Miao, one of the school beauty of Huaxi College.
 Li Sa as the boss/doctor.
 Chen Meihang as Li Shujia.
 Zheng Huixin as Tuantuan.
 Fu Yuhan as Haohao.
 Yang Li as Tuantuan's mother.
 Bai Lihui as Tuantuan's father.
 Liao Libin as Su Su's father.
 Wang Ruli as Su Su's mother.
 Mo Xi'er as the broadcaster.

Music
 Zhao Yihuan - "The Past That Can't Go Back"

Accolades

References

External links
 
 

2013 films
2013 horror thriller films
2013 horror films
Chinese horror thriller films
Films directed by Guan Er